Charles Rochat (born 1885, date of death unknown) was a Swiss fencer. He competed in the team foil event at the 1924 Summer Olympics.

References

External links
 

1885 births
Year of death missing
Swiss male fencers
Olympic fencers of Switzerland
Fencers at the 1924 Summer Olympics